Esat Valla (born 22 April 1944) is a Kosovar Albanian painter noted for his figurative paintings of small animals or insects such as butterflies and birds.

Life

Esat Valla was  born on 22 April 1944 in Gjakova, where he attended primary school.
In 1965 he graduated from the Secondary School of Art in  Peć.
In 1971 he graduated from the Academy of Arts in Belgrade (now the University of Arts in Belgrade), where he studied painting under professor  Zoran Petrovic.
From 1974 he was a member of the Association of Figurative Artists of Kosovo.
He has been working at the Faculty of Arts since 1976, where he teaches painting to undergraduates and graduates, with the title of  Ordinary Professor at the Universiteti i Prishtinës.
In 1981 he received a master's degree from the Academy of Figurative Arts.
From 1982–84 he was chairman of the Association of Figurative Artists in Gjakova and from 1990–96 he was chairman of the Association of Figurative Artists of Kosovo. 
He has studied in Italy, France, Spain, Portugal, Czechoslovakia, Poland, Turkey, Greece and Albania.

Work

Esat Valla's work is surreal, half figurative, half abstract and highly individualistic.
He has participated in many group exhibitions, as well as personal exhibitions both nationally and internationally.
His work is held in various galleries, museums and private collections.

In December 2013 the Kosova National Art Gallery opened a retrospective exhibition with 60 paintings by Esat Valla from his early youth in 1964 up to 2013.
The curator, Zeni Ballazhi, said he tried to select works from the artist's different cycles or periods.
One of these cycles is "Butterflies", created from March 1981 at the time of the demonstrations in Kosovo as a metaphor of sacrificed youth.
Works, some of which had not been exhibited before, included drawings and paintings on paper and fabric.
Themes included Albanian traditions, as well as surreal and abstract works.

Awards

Awards include:
1974 – The Public's Prize, Spring Salon, Pristina
1978 – League of Prizren Prize, Prizren
1980 – The Public's Prize, Spring Salon, Pristina
1982 – Mosa Pijade Prize, the ll-th Kosova Spring Salon, Pristina
1983 – Prize at the 9th Biennial of Drawing, Pristina
1988 – The Public's Prize, Spring Salon, Pristina
1994 – Prize for Painting , The Migration contest

See also
List of Albanian painters

References

Sources

Kosovan painters
Albanian painters
1944 births
Living people
Artists from Gjakova